Ivernian  may refer to:

one of the Iverni
Primitive Irish
Ivernic language